Kozhipathy  is a village in the Palakkad district, state of Kerala, India. It forms a part of the Eruthampathy gram panchayat.

Demographics
 India census, Kozhipathy had a population of 11714 with 5870 males and 5844 females.

References

Kozhipathy